Byron Cook may refer to:

Byron Cook (computer scientist), computer science researcher
Byron Cook (politician) (born 1954), Republican member of the Texas House of Representatives

See also
Cook (surname)